Dolly Alderton (born 31 August 1988) is a British journalist, author and podcaster. She is a columnist for The Sunday Times. Her memoir Everything I Know About Love won a 2018 National Book Award for autobiography and was shortlisted for the 2019 Non-Fiction Narrative Book of the Year in the British Book Awards, and adapted into a BBC/Peacock eponymous television drama series.

Early life
Alderton was born in London and raised in Stanmore. She was born to British and Canadian parents, and describes herself as "half Canadian".  Born Hannah Alderton, she changed her name to Dolly in her early teens. She was educated at St Margaret's School in Bushey, and Rugby School, where she boarded in the sixth form. She earned a degree in Drama and English from the University of Exeter, and a master's degree in journalism from City University.

Career 
Alderton is an author, journalist and podcast host.

Journalism
Alderton began writing for The Sunday Times in 2015, working initially as a dating columnist from 2015 to 2017.

In 2020, she began working as an agony aunt for The Sunday Times in her column Dear Dolly.

Books
Alderton's debut book, Everything I Know About Love, was published in February 2018. BBC News described it as "offering readers a frank and deeply personal account of friendships, relationships and growing up as a millennial." The memoir was shortlisted for the National Book Awards in 2018 in the Autobiography category  (won that year by Michelle Obama for Becoming). It was shortlisted for the 2018 Waterstones Book of the Year. In October 2020, Alderton was working on a TV adaptation of Everything I Know About Love. It was produced by  Working Title Television and Universal International Studios for BBC, with a screenplay by Alderton, directed by China Moo-Young.

Her first novel, Ghosts, was published in October 2020 by Fig Tree. The novel concerns a 32-year-old food writer, Nina, who meets someone through a dating app, while her father is beginning to show signs of dementia. In October 2020, it was reported that Alderton had sold the film rights to Ghosts.

In October 2022, Alderton released a third book entitled Dear Dolly. The book is a collection of her Sunday Times columns and also includes a new personal essay.

Podcasts 
Alderton co-created and co-hosted The High Low with Pandora Sykes. The High Low was a weekly podcast focusing on pop culture and current affairs. The podcast ran for four years and over 150 episodes were recorded. The final episode aired on 2 December 2020. The High Low: A Christmas Special Live Stream took place on 8 December 2020 to raise funds for Blood Cancer UK.

Alderton presented the podcast Love Stories in conjunction with her book Everything I Know About Love, where she interviewed a number of guests including Stanley Tucci, Ruth Jones and Marian Keyes. Season one was released between February 2018 and May 2018, and season two between January 2019 and March 2019. In January 2019, Penguin published a feature titled Six inspiring lessons I learnt from Love Stories, where Alderton described the experience as a "great privilege".

Alderton has been a guest on numerous podcasts, including Off Menu with Ed Gamble and James Acaster, How to Fail with Elizabeth Day, and Table Manners with Jessie Ware.

From February to April 2021, Alderton co-hosted a spin-off series for the Sentimental Garbage podcast titled Sentimental in the City with Caroline O'Donoghue. In March 2021, the podcast received a five-star review in The Times.

Themes
Alderton's work explores themes of love, female friendship, and her experiences living as a millennial woman.

Naomi Gordon described Alderton's award-winning memoir Everything I Know about Love as "self-deprecating, and occasionally heartbreaking[,] musings on love, friendship, relationships, and growing up as millennial".

Film, TV and radio
From 2011, Alderton worked as a story producer for series 2-5 of the BAFTA-winning Made in Chelsea, made by Monkey Kingdom.

Alderton has written and directed two independent films with her writing partner Lauren Bensted. Alderton released The Confluence, a documentary about Tagg's Island in 2014, and Anna Island, a short film accepted to the London Short Film Festival, in 2015.

Alderton worked as a script assistant on the final series of Channel 4's Fresh Meat and directed the behind-the-scenes online videos for the last series of Fresh Meat and the last series of Channel 4's Peep Show.

Alderton adapted her book Everything I Know About Love into a romantic comedy with Working Title TV. In May 2021, Alderton announced the adaptation had been commissioned by the BBC and later by Peacock in the US. The BBC synopsis describes the romantic comedy as a portrayal of two best friends, Maggie and Birdy, as they "finally land in London to live it large, when the unexpected happens – dependable Birdy gets a steady boyfriend." It has been described as a "generous, funny, warm-hearted and uplifting Sex & The City for millennials which covers bad dates and squalid flat-shares, heartaches and humiliations, and, most importantly, unbreakable female friendships". The drama premiered on BBC One in June 2022 and stars Emma Appleton, Bel Powley, Marli Siu and Aliyah Odoffin. All episodes are available to stream on BBC iPlayer.
In the same month, it was announced that NBCUniversal's Peacock picked the series as well for US streaming to add to its original programming catalogue lineup for the summer season, and it premiered on August 25, 2022.

In 2020, she appeared on BBC Radio 4's Great Lives, nominating American actress Doris Day.

Recognition
She appeared in a Forbes 30 Under 30 List in 2018. In 2019, she was a judge for the Women's Prize for Fiction.

Personal life
Food is one of her principal interests, and she has named spaghetti vongole as her preferred last meal, and is passionate about pickling and vinegar.

Books
 (Reissued "With a new chapter on everything I know at thirty")

References

External links

1988 births
Living people
British women columnists
British women novelists
Alumni of the University of Exeter
21st-century British novelists
21st-century British journalists
21st-century British women writers
Journalists from London
Writers from London
People educated at St Margaret's School, Bushey
People educated at Rugby School
Alumni of City, University of London
British people of Canadian descent
The Sunday Times people
British columnists
21st-century British non-fiction writers
British women memoirists
British memoirists
21st-century memoirists
People from Stanmore
Made in Chelsea